The Lockyer Creek is a creek located in South East Queensland, Australia. A tributary of the Brisbane River, the creek is a major drainage system in the Lockyer Valley. The creek is named after Edmund Lockyer.

Course and features

Draining parts of the western Scenic Rim, the creek's headwaters are in the Main Range National Park, a small sub-section of the Great Dividing Range.

Tributaries flowing into Lockyer Creek include Flagstone Creek, Sandy Creek, Alice Creek, Laidley Creek, Tenthill Creek, Murphys Creek and Ma Ma Creek.

Lower areas of the catchment have been cleared for intensive agriculture. Upper parts of the catchment remain mostly forested, partially protected within Lockyer National Park formerly known as White Mountain State Forest. Bushfires, soil protection, water quality and flood management are the main resource management issues for the waterway. The creek is significantly degraded. The poor conditions have resulted in unstable stream banks and gully erosion from the removal of riparian vegetation.

There are a total of nine major private and public water storages within this drainage system, including Atkinson Dam, Bill Gunn Dam and Lake Clarendon. The Lockyer Creek valley had been one of the driest catchments in Queensland during the recent droughts in Australia.

Flood events

A report by GHD Group for the Brisbane City Council suggested that flood mitigating dams on Lockyer Creek and Bremer River could be a useful measure for flood proofing Brisbane.

Bridges

The Lockyer Creek Bridge at Bageli Park, designed by William Pagan, is one of the largest of its type in Queensland and one of Australia's first reinforced concrete arch rail bridges. The bridge, built in 1910/1911, features three spans, each supported by two arches, and appeared on a stamp that was part of a series featuring landmark bridges. A model of the bridge was featured in the April 2011 edition of the Australian Model Railway Magazine. The bridge is still used for very heavy Brisbane bound coal and grain traffic. Further downstream in the district of Clarendon, an earlier railway structure (1885) built of timber piles with a deck of iron trusses, is possibly as spectacular. This bridge is no longer used by rail traffic.

Heritage listings
Lockyer Creek has a number of heritage-listed sites, including:
 Toowoomba – Helidon Line: Lockyer Creek Railway Bridge (Lockyer)
 Toowoomba – Helidon Line: Lockyer Creek Railway Bridge (Murphys Creek)
 Brisbane Valley railway line: Lockyer Creek Railway Bridge (Clarendon)

See also

References

External links

Tributaries of the Brisbane River
Floods in Queensland
Lockyer Valley Region